9 is a number, numeral, and glyph.

9 or nine may also refer to:

Dates 
 AD 9, the ninth year of the AD era
 9 BC, the ninth year before the AD era
 9, numerical symbol for the month of September

Places 
 Nine, Portugal, a parish in the town of Vila Nova de Famalicão
 Planet Nine, a planet proposed to exist in the outer Solar System
 Zheleznogorsk, Krasnoyarsk Krai, Russia, a closed town
 The 9, a residential portion of Ameritrust Tower in Cleveland

People 
 Louis Niñé (1922–1983), a New York politician whose surname is usually rendered "Nine"
 Nine (rapper) (born 1969), a hip hop musician
 Tech N9ne (born 1971), an American rapper

Fictional characters
 The Nine, epithet for the Nazgûl in J. R. R. Tolkien's Middle-earth legendarium
 ⑨, a derogatory name for Cirno, an ice fairy from the dōjin game Touhou Project

Literature 
 The Nine (book), a 2007 book by Jeffrey Toobin
 NiNe. magazine, a magazine for teenage girls
 Nine (manga), a 1978 baseball manga series by Mitsuru Adachi
 "9" inset comics magazine in Eleftherotypia, a Greek newspaper

Films 
 9 (2002 film), a feature film by Ümit Ünal
 9 (2005 film), a short film by Shane Acker
 9 (2009 animated film), a feature film based on the short film by Shane Acker
 9 (2016 film), a Canadian collaborative film by nine directors 
 9 (2019 film), a Malayalam feature film starring Prithviraj Sukumaran
 9 (2021 film), a Uruguayan-Argentine sports drama film
 Nine (2009 live-action film), a film based on the musical of the same name
 Nines (film), a 2003 film
 The Nines, a 2007 film starring Ryan Reynolds

Television

TV shows 
 The Nine (TV series), a serial drama television show that aired on ABC
 Nine (TV series), a 2013 South Korean TV series
 The 9, a local TV news programme, also known as The 6 (news programme)
 KBS News 9, a South Korean flagship news program broadcast on KBS 1
 The Nine (BBC Scotland), a nightly news programme in Scotland, airing at 9pm
 9 (TV series), a 2018 Burmese television series

TV networks, stations, channels
 My 9, branding for New York City television channel WWOR-TV
 WGN 9, branding for Chicago television channel WGN-TV
 Nine Network, a TV network in Australia

Other visual media 
 Nine (musical), a 1982 Broadway musical, also with a film version
 9: The Last Resort, a 1996 computer game
 The9, a NASDAQ-listed Chinese game publisher specializing in MMORPGs
 The 9 on Yahoo!, a daily video compilation of "web finds"
 Mighty No. 9, a platforming video game

Music 
 Ninth, in music theory, the ninth note of a musical scale or the interval between the first and ninth notes

Albums 
 9 (Cashmere Cat album), 2017
 9 (Damien Rice album), 2006
 9 (Eros Ramazzotti album), 2003
 9 (Lara Fabian album), 2005 
 9 (Mercyful Fate album), 1999
 9 (Public Image Ltd. album), 1989
 9 (Do As Infinity album), 2001
 9 (Alice Nine album), 2012
 9 (Lil' Kim album), 2019
 9 (Polina Gagarina album), 2016
 9 (Pond album), 2021
 9 (Jason Aldean album), 2019
 Nine (Fairport Convention album), 1973 
 Nine (Shankar Mahadevan album), 2003
 Nine (Circus Maximus album), 2012
 Nine (Tim Hardin album), 1973
 Nine (Samantha Jade album), 2015
 Nine (Blink-182 album), 2019
 Nine (Sault album), 2021

Songs 
 "9", track 2 of Drake on the album Views, released in 2016
 "Nine", the first single of Leeds-based band ¡Forward, Russia!, released in April 2005
 "Nine", a song on the Grand Magus album Wolf's Return
 "Nine", a song on the Neurosis album Given to the Rising
 "The Nine", a 1998 song by drum and bass group Bad Company

Bands 
 9nine or 9 nine (pronounced "nine"), a Japanese girl group
 Nine (band), a Swedish hardcore band
 The9 (group), a Chinese girl group
 Slipknot (band), an American heavy metal band sometimes called The Nine, referring to its number of members

Sports 
 Niners, a reference to The San Francisco 49ers
 Number 9, the shirt number often worn by an association football team's centre forward
 False 9 or False Number 9, a term used to describe an unconventional association football lone striker or centre-forward, who drops deep into midfield

Transportation 
 9 (New York City Subway service), a designation given to several IRT services of the New York City Subway
 9 (Los Angeles Railway), a line operated by the Los Angeles Railway from 1932 to 1956
 Renault 9, a family car
 DS 9, an executive car

Other uses 
 9 mm caliber, a firearms cartridge & bullet size
 9×19mm Parabellum, a popular handgun cartridge
 Nine Entertainment, an Australian media company and brand
 Nines (notation), a term used to indicate purity of metals or chemicals, or the availability of a system
 9, X-SAMPA symbol for an open-mid front rounded vowel

See also 

Nina (name)
 
 
 
 
 09 (disambiguation), the numerical abbreviation
 Nines (disambiguation)
 Number nine (disambiguation)